The women's 100 metres event at the 2016 IAAF World U20 Championships was held at Zdzisław Krzyszkowiak Stadium on 20 and 21 July.

Medalists

Records

Results

Heats
Qualification: The first 3 of each heat (Q) and the 6 fastest times (q) qualified

Wind:Heat 1: -1.6 m/s, Heat 2: -0.8 m/s, Heat 3: +1.7 m/s, Heat 4: +2.7 m/s, Heat 5: -0.4 m/s, Heat 6: +0.2 m/s

Semifinals
Qualification: The first 2 of each heat (Q) and the 2 fastest times (q) qualified

Wind:Heat 1: +0.7 m/s, Heat 2: +2.0 m/s, Heat 3: +0.4 m/s

Final
Wind: +0.9

References

External links
 100 metres schedule

100 metres
100 metres at the World Athletics U20 Championships
2016 in women's athletics